The Yoruba Arts festival first started in 2009 as an annual festival to celebrate the rich, vibrant, and colorful arts and culture of the Yoruba's in London, UK. Its first event was in 2010 in Clissold Park Hackney London, where has existed since its inception.

The Yoruba's are a people predominantly from Western Nigeria who over time migrated to other parts of West Africa to Togo, Benin, Ghana, Senegal, Mali and Sierra-Leone, and Liberia. They are also the largest group of people taken during the Trans-Atlantic Slave trade holocaust to the West Indies and Latin America where their culture, traditions, and belief systems have stood the test of time and are still being practiced. The Yoruba IFA/Orisa belief system created the foundation for new age religions such as Santeria, Umbanda, and Lucumi. As a global culture, the Yorubas remain linked around the world through language, history, art, music as well as the belief and practice of IFA/ Orisa.

In the UK, the Yoruba's are the largest group of people from outside Nigeria and Africa who have made important contributions to their communities and local governments in education, sports, medicine, business, religion, media, politics, and charitable causes.

The 9th edition of the festival returns to Clissold Park, Hackney, London on Saturday the 21st and Sunday 22 July 2018 celebrating the rich, colorful and vibrant Arts and Culture of the Yoruba's from around the world. Featuring Cultural performances, Workshops, Arts and crafts, Competitions, African Market, African food and live music from artists and bands showcasing the wide variety of popular Yoruba music such as Afrobeats, Juju, Highlife, Apala and Jazz.

The Yoruba Arts Festival returns for its 10th year at Clissold Park in October 2019. The festival will be held during Black History month to celebrate not only Yoruba Arts and Culture but the contributions and achievements of African Arts and Culture in the UK. The event will feature Cultural performances, workshops, African Arts and Crafts market, traditional African food, and live music from local and international bands performing a variety of African, Nigerian, and Yoruba music. The annual festival is organized, produced, and funded by the Yoruba Foundation, the UK registered non-profit charity whose main objectives are to promote Yoruba Arts and Culture through free community and charitable programs.

References

External links 
 

Yoruba festivals
Festivals in London
Yoruba diaspora